Drasteria petricola, the little arches, is a moth of the family Erebidae. The species was first described by Francis Walker in 1858. It is found in western North America from Yukon and the Northwest Territories south to New Mexico in the Rocky Mountains, east to Manitoba.

The wingspan is about 34 mm. Adults are on wing from May to July.

The larvae feed on Hedysarum species. Adults feed on the nectar of flowers, including mint in Utah.

References

Subspecies
Drasteria petricola petricola
Drasteria petricola athabasca (Neumoegen, 1883) (mountains of British Columbia)
Drasteria petricola crokeri (Barnes & Benjamin, 1924) (prairie populations)

External links

Drasteria
Moths of North America
Moths described in 1858